The Ogasawara-Hakushaku-Tei (小笠原伯爵邸) is the former residence of Count Ogasawara Nagayoshi (1885-1935), located in Shinjuku, Tokyo.

It was built in 1927. The style is in the Spanish Colonial Revival architecture and inside the cigar room is in the Moorish Revival architecture.

See also 
 Kyu-Iwasaki-tei Garden
 Former Tanaka Family Residence

References

External links 
 http://www.ogasawaratei.com/ Official homepage

Buildings and structures in Shinjuku
Ogasawara clan